Kreis Pleschen was a county in the southern administrative district of Posen, in the Prussian province of Posen. It presently lies in the south-eastern part of Polish region of Greater Poland Voivodeship.

Districts of the Province of Posen